Rapids Water Park is a water park in Riviera Beach, Florida, United States, that occupies 30 acres.

The park includes 42 slides and attractions, including a wave pool (up to six-foot waves), dual seven-story speed slides, and a quarter-mile lazy river. There are also slides for children and toddlers.

History 
In 2009, the park bought  just north of the park for $2.2 million.

In 2000, Miami born rapper, Trina shot her video "Pull Over" at the Park.

In 2009, the MTV reality show Jersey Shore requested to film at the park, but were denied.

Rapids Water Park celebrated its 30th anniversary in 2009, inviting the racecar driver Danica Patrick to the park for the festivities.

The park appears in the film Donnie Brasco during the water park scene.

Attractions
The park's website breaks the intensity of their rides and attractions into three categories:

Biggest
The most intense rides includes:
Big Thunder - A dark ProSlide Tornado with a funnel at the end.
Black Thunder - Another ProSlide Tornado slide, taking place completely in the dark.  The ride has been recently limited to two riders per tube due to safety concerns.
Raging Rapids - Four-rider raft slide.
Riptide Raftin' - Five-rider raft slide.
Brain Drain - Dual trapdoor water slide with a seven-story tall drop, 8 seconds long.

Coolest
Rides and attractions designed for all ages include:
Baby Blue - Single rider.
Big Red - Single or two-rider raft.
Mega mayhem-
 the new water coaster features two side-by-side flumes, where riders speed down twists and high-banked turns as they are propelled uphill by a unique blast jet propulsion technology. Riders will experience drop and dive sensations along the way and will be able to see other riders on the slide through open low-separator walls..
Pirate's Plunge - Two speed slides;
Tubin' Tornadoes - Two single- or double-rider raft dark slides.

Wettest
Child- and family-friendly rides and areas include:
Alligator Alley - A smaller-scale version of Criss Crossing.
Big Surf - A wave pool covering .
Criss Crossing - A pool guest can attempt to jump across using slippery, floating objects and an over-head net.
FlowRider - continuous 35 mph simulated wave pool.  
Lazy River - A lazy river ride that can be used for transportation around the park.
Splash Hill - Eight slides, including two racing slides and two dark slides.
Splish Splash Lagoon - Three family slides and play pools.
BareFootin' Bay - A water play structure with interactive features like sprayers, 3 slides and a giant pineapple tipping bucket.

In popular culture
The music video for the song "Empty Threat" by the band Chvrches was shot at the park.

References

1979 establishments in Florida
Water parks in Florida
Buildings and structures in West Palm Beach, Florida
Tourist attractions in Palm Beach County, Florida